Joe Fuca is an American businessman, best known as current CEO of Reputation.com and a former executive at DocuSign and FinancialForce.  Prior to his CEO role, he previously spent more than 30 years in technology and Software-as-a-Service growth companies.

Early life and education
Fuca grew up in Southern California and attended Crespi Carmelite High School in Encino.

He was awarded a football scholarship to California Lutheran University, where he is the program's third-leading all-time receiver by total yardage.  He also played college baseball and basketball. He received a Bachelor's in both Business Administration and Communications Arts. While in college he served the head coach of a Thousand Oaks High School basketball team.

Career
Fuca has more than 30 years experience in technology growth companies.  Fuca served in management roles at Evolve Software and PeopleSoft. Fuca later spent years as a senior executive at each of MarketLive (2004-2008) and McAffee (2008-2011).

In 2011, Fuca joined DocuSign as senior vice president of worldwide sales. During his tenure, revenue grew from $25 million to $250 million annually.

In 2016, Fuca entered the role of president of field operations at FinancialForce. Fuca served during a period of growth and increasing margins.

Fuca currently serves as CEO of Reputation.com. He succeeded founder Michael Fertik, who served as interim CEO and returned to his role as executive chairman. Ted Schlein, general partner at Kleiner Perkins Caufield & Byers noted that KPCB has now invested in two companies led by Fuca.

Community
In 2003, Fuca founded the San Francisco Bay Area AAU basketball team "Lakeshow." He describes the goal of the program as to "get our kids exposure and put them in a college setting so they can be seen by college coaches" in order to receive college scholarship opportunities.  Lakeshow alumni currently playing professional basketball include Mark Tollefsen.

References

Living people
American technology chief executives
21st-century American businesspeople
Year of birth missing (living people)